Grimes Township is one of sixteen townships in Cerro Gordo County, Iowa, USA.  As of the 2000 census, its population was 851.

Geography
According to the USGS, it contains one cemetery, Pleasant View.

References

External links
 US-Counties.com
 City-Data.com

Townships in Cerro Gordo County, Iowa
Mason City, Iowa micropolitan area
Townships in Iowa